Goliath transmitter was a very low frequency (VLF) transmitter for communicating with submarines, built by Nazi Germany's Kriegsmarine navy near Kalbe an der Milde in Saxony-Anhalt, Germany, which was in service from 1943 to 1945. It was capable of transmission power of between 100 and 1000 kW and was the most powerful transmitter of its time.

History
Submarines are shielded by conducting seawater from ordinary radio communication frequencies, but radio waves in the very low frequency (VLF) band from 3 to 30 kHz can penetrate seawater to depths of about 50 feet, allowing submarines to receive communications without surfacing and becoming vulnerable to detection.    From 1943 to the end of World War II, Goliath was the main radio transmitter for German submarine radio communications, operating on frequencies between 15 and 25 kHz with a main working frequency of 16.55 kHz.    Transmitting up to 1000 kilowatts of power, Goliath's transmissions could be received worldwide including submerged submarines in the Caribbean, but had difficulty penetrating Norwegian fjords.

Technical characteristics
Goliath used three umbrella antennas, which were arranged radially around three 210 metre tall guyed steel tube masts and were insulated against ground. At their edges these antennas were mounted on grounded 170 metre tall guyed lattice steel masts. Three of these masts carried two umbrella antennas to comprise 15 lattice steel masts.

Legacy of Goliath after 1945

Shortly after World War II, the Goliath transmitter buildings and antennas were reportedly destroyed by the Soviet Union. Today only a large mast base remains of the original installation.

According to the interview given in 2007 by the commander of the present-day Goliath facility in Russia, Captain 1st Rank Yuri Gorev, to the Nizhny Novgorod edition of Argumenty i Fakty, Goliath was rebuilt between 1949 and 1952 in the Kudma River valley, in the southern suburbs of Nizhny Novgorod (Kstovsky District). Since then, the station has been transmitting commands and time signals RJH90 for the Russian Navy. Since the 1960s, it has also participated in tracking spacecraft. The nearby settlement for the staff of the facility is known under the name Druzhniy.

The antenna system of Vileyka VLF transmitter greatly resembles that of Goliath, but all its masts are about 100 metres taller.

References

External links

 
 
 http://skyscraperpage.com/diagrams/?b60795
 http://skyscraperpage.com/diagrams/?b60797
 Kalbe at Google Maps
 Druzhny at Google Maps

Buildings and structures in Nizhny Novgorod Oblast
Communications in the Soviet Union
Military radio systems
Former radio masts and towers
Radio masts and towers in Germany
Relocated buildings and structures
Signals intelligence of World War II
Towers completed in 1943
1943 establishments in Germany
1945 disestablishments in Germany